Mohan Singh Gunjyal is an Indian mountaineer and adventure sportsman. He is one of the summiters of Mount Everest, entering the list when he successfully climbed the highest peak in the world on 12 May 1992. He achieved the feat, taking the Southeast ridge route via the south face, as a member of the Indo-Tibetan Border Police Everest expedition group, which included Santosh Yadav, the first woman to summit the peak twice within a year.  He has received the Tenzing Norgay National Award for outstanding achievement from the President of India in 2004. He is a former Assistant Commandant of Indo-Tibetan Border Police and presently working as  Director (Technical Training) at the Uttarkashi-based Nanda Devi Institute of Adventure Sports and Outdoor Education. The Government of India awarded him with Tenzing Norgay National Adventure Award 2004 in lifetime achievement category and the fourth highest civilian honor of the Padma Shri, in 2006, for his contributions to the sport of mountaineering.

See also 
Indian summiters of Mount Everest - Year wise
List of Mount Everest summiters by number of times to the summit
List of Mount Everest records of India
List of Mount Everest records

References

External links 
 

Recipients of the Padma Shri in sports
Year of birth missing (living people)
Indian mountain climbers
Indian summiters of Mount Everest
Living people
Recipients of the Tenzing Norgay National Adventure Award